Jodrell is a surname. Notable people with the surname include:

 Alfred Jodrell (1847–1929), English collector
 Henry Jodrell (1750–1814), British politician, MP for Great Yarmouth and for Bramber, Sussex
 Neville Jodrell (1858–1932), British politician, MP for Mid Norfolk and for King's Lynn
 Paul Jodrell (1746–1803), English physician
 Richard Paul Jodrell (1745–1831), British classical scholar and playwright.
 Steve Jodrell, Australian stage director
 Thomas Jodrell Phillips Jodrell (1807–1889), barrister, land-owner and philanthropist

See also
 Jodrell Bank Centre for Astrophysics, at the University of Manchester
 Jodrell Bank Observatory, radio observatory at the University of Manchester
 Jodrell baronets, in the Baronetage of Great Britain
 Jodrell Hall, formerly a mansion, now used as a school in Cheshire, England